Bringing Rain is a 2003 independent film written and directed by Noah Buschel. It premiered at the 2003 Tribeca Film Festival and was released on DVD on September 20, 2005. It won first prize at the Rhode Island International Film Festival for directorial debut.

Plot
A car accident involving baseball star Clay Askins (Grenier) and his swimmer girlfriend Neisha Sanders (Butler) indirectly affects the lives of a small group of students living at a New Jersey boarding school.

Cast
Adrian Grenier as Clay Askins
Niesha Butler as Neisha Sanders
Merritt Wever as Monica Greenfield
Paz de la Huerta as Dakota Cunningham
Ryan Donowho as Atlee Surnamer
Larisa Oleynik as Ori Swords
Noah Fleiss as Marcus Swords 
Rodrigo Lopresti as Reb Babbitt
Ray Santiago as John Bell
Alexis Dziena as Lysee Key
Olek Krupa as Headmaster Gula
Val Emmich as Prentiss Bergen
Nathalie Paulding as Mu

References

External links 
 

2003 films
American independent films
2003 drama films
American drama films
2003 directorial debut films
2003 independent films
2000s English-language films
Films directed by Noah Buschel
2000s American films